The Bowman–Heidenhain hypothesis is an early explanation of renal function and urinary secretion. 

The hypothesis states that the kidney is first and foremost a secreting gland. According to the theory, glomeruli are merely filters, while the tubules are the true secretory structures. To prove his hypothesis, Rudolph Heidenhain injected methylene blue into an animal's bloodstream, which soon appeared in the urine. More evident proof of this theory is that when the tubules are destroyed, urine becomes watery and urea and other toxic products remain in the blood. 

This theory was later merged with the Ludwig theory to form the modern theory.

References

Kidney
Biological hypotheses